The 2021 FFAS Senior League was the 40th season of the FFAS Senior League, the top American Samoan professional league for association football clubs since its establishment in 1976. Pago Youth are the defending champions. The start date for the season was 21 August 2021.

Teams
Ten teams competed in the league – the one disappearance from the previous season being Taputimu Youth.

 Black Roses
 Green Bay
 Ilaoa and To'omata
 Lion Heart
 Pago Youth
 PanSa
 Royal Puma
 Tafuna Jets
 Utulei Youth
 Vaiala Tongan

League table

Results

References

FFAS Senior League seasons
2021 in Oceanian association football leagues
2021 in American Samoan football